The Holden Commodore (VY) is an executive car that was produced by Holden from 2002 to 2004. It was the third iteration of the third generation of the Commodore. Its range included the luxury variants, Holden Berlina (VY) and Holden Calais (VY); commercial versions were called the Holden One Tonner (VY), Holden Ute (VY), and Holden Crewman (VY). In 2003, the range also saw the introduction of the first Commodore-based all-wheel drive variants, including the Holden Adventra (VY) wagon.

Overview 
Released in September 2002 and produced until August 2004 (with a Series II released in August 2003), the VY series was the first major design departure (both inside and out) of the third generation Commodore range released in August 1997. It launched at the same time as the Ford Falcon (BA).

The range included the following models:
 Commodore Executive
 Commodore Acclaim
 Commodore S
 Commodore SV8
 Commodore SS
 Berlina
 Calais

These models were all offered as sedans, and wagons only with the Executive, Acclaim and Berlina. However, it was equipped with 17-inch alloy wheels as opposed to the 18-inch wheels on the sedan. 500 such wagons were produced for Series I, and 350 for Series II.

The VY was the last Commodore to use the 3.8-litre Ecotec V6 engines.

Development

Design 
The front and rear of the body had minor restyling, with a new front grille, headlights and taillights. The interior has been significantly upgraded. Interior upgrade includes a new instrument panel, centre console and steering wheel and new design transmission lever and handbrake. There is also a new mobile phone power outlet under the centre console. The new instrument cluster features a large multi-function digital display (single or triple window, depending on model), which displays information such as radio station display, PRND321 gear selected indicator, trip computer with stopwatch function, service reminders and a help facility.

Standard features (on some models) now include "twilight sentinel" - automatic headlamp control, programmable headlamps off time delay, high feature Blaupunkt audio systems, road-speed sensitive intermittent wipers and passenger airbags.

The VY Series II update added cruise control, front power windows variable front seat lumbar support, and revised interior trims. A 245 kW (329 hp) V8 was introduced to sports variants and a sportier repositioning of the Calais model. This repositioning included a subtle body kit, the option of a 235 kW V8 in place of the previous 225 kW (302 hp) and a firmer suspension tune (known as FE 1.5) that was not as stiff as the FE2 suspension on sports variants.

Powertrains

Models

Commodore Executive 

The Executive is the baseline model of the VY Commodore range. Pricing for the Executive started from A$31,650.

The Executive features included:
 3.8 L 152 kW (204 hp) ECOTEC V6
 5-speed manual transmission (option of 4-speed automatic transmission)
 Anti-lock braking system (ABS)
 Brake assist (BA)
 CD player
 Driver's and passenger's airbags
 Independent rear suspension (IRS)
 Power antenna
 Security system
 Trip computer
 15-inch steel wheels
 Cruise control
 Air conditioning

Commodore Acclaim 

The Acclaim is one model up from the base model of the VY Commodore range. Pricing for the Acclaim started from A$37,510.

The Acclaim features included:
 3.8 L 152 kW (204 hp) ECOTEC V6
 4-speed automatic transmission
 Air conditioning
 Anti-lock braking system (ABS)
 Brake assist (BA)
 CD player
 Cruise control
 Driver's and passenger's airbags
 Front and rear power windows
 Independent rear suspension (IRS)
 Power antenna
 Security system
 Side impact airbags (SIAB)
 Traction control system (TCS)
 Trip computer
 15-inch alloy wheels

Commodore S 

The S is the cheapest sports variant. Pricing for the S started from A$37,820.

The S features included:
 3.8 L 152 kW (204 hp) ECOTEC V6 (option of 171 kW (229 hp) Supercharged V6)
 5-speed manual transmission (option of 4-speed automatic transmission)
 Air conditioning
 Anti-lock braking system (ABS)
 Brake assist (BA)
 CD player
 Cruise control
 Driver's and passenger's airbags
 FE2 sports suspension
 Front and rear power windows
 Independent rear suspension (IRS)
 Power antenna
 Security system
 Traction control system (TCS)
 Trip computer
 16-inch alloy wheels (17-inch alloy wheels on the Series II)

Commodore SV8 

The VY Commodore was the first to not offer a V8 option on the Executive model. Buyers now had to choose the new SV8 as the cheapest V8 variant. The SV8 was essentially an Executive with a V8 engine, rear spoiler and unique 17 inch alloy wheels. Pricing for the SV8 started from A$40,490.

The SV8 features included:
 5.7 L 235 kW (315 hp) V8 (245 kW (329 hp) High Output V8 in Series II)
 6-speed manual transmission (option of 4-speed automatic transmission)
 Air conditioning
 Anti-lock braking system (ABS)
 Brake assist (BA)
 CD player
 Driver's and passenger's airbags
 FE2 sports suspension
 Limited slip differential (LSD)
 Independent rear suspension (IRS)
 Power antenna
 Security system
 Traction control system (TCS)
 Trip computer
 17-inch alloy wheels

Commodore SS 

The SS was the flagship sports model of the VY range. Pricing for the SS started from A$49,490.

The SS features included:
 5.7 L 235 kW (315 hp) V8 (245 kW (329 hp) High Output V8 in Series II)
 6-speed manual transmission (option of 4-speed automatic transmission)
 Single in-dash CD player (option of 6 disc in-dash cd player)
 Air conditioning
 Anti-lock braking system (ABS)
 Brake assist (BA)
 Cruise control
 Driver's and passenger's airbags
 FE2 sports suspension
 Front and rear power windows
 Independent rear suspension (IRS)
 Limited slip differential (LSD)
 Power antenna
 Security system
 Side impact airbags (SIAB)
 Traction control system (TCS)
 Trip computer
 18-inch alloy wheels

Berlina 

The Berlina is the semi-luxury version of the VY range; it sits above the Acclaim and below the Calais. Pricing for the Berlina starts from A$40,850.

The Berlina features included:
 3.8 L 152 kW (204 hp) ECOTEC V6 (option of 225 kW (302 hp) LS1 V8)
 4-speed automatic transmission
 6-disc in-dash CD player
 Anti-lock braking system (ABS)
 Brake assist (BA)
 Climate control air conditioning
 Cruise control
 Driver's and passenger's airbags
 Front and rear power windows
 Independent rear suspension (IRS)
 Power antenna
 Security system
 Side impact airbags (SIAB)
 Traction control system (TCS)
 Trip computer
 16-inch alloy wheels

Berlina International 
A limited run of 325 VY series 1 wagons (all in the colour Turbine Grey) was released in 2002. These were a level above the Berlina with some Calais options which include the following:

 Calais headlights
 Unique satin grey badging
 Dual-zone climate control
 8-way electric front seats without memory function
 Pistachio Green leather seats with Racquet cloth inserts
 4 custom floor mats
 6-spoke alloy wheels from the WH Statesman

Calais 

The Calais is the top-of-the-line luxury model in the VY range; it sits above the Berlina and combines luxury with performance. Pricing for the Calais starts from A$56,250.

The Calais features included:
 3.8 L 171 kW (229 hp) Supercharged ECOTEC V6 (option of 152 kW (204 hp) ECOTEC V6 or 225 kW LS1 V8 (302 hp) then 235 kW (315 hp) LS1 V8 in Series II)
 4-speed automatic transmission
 6-disc in-dash CD player
 Bose speakers
 Anti-lock braking system (ABS)
 Brake Assist (BA)
 Climate control air conditioning
 Cruise control
 Driver's and passenger's airbags
 Front and rear power windows
 Independent rear suspension (IRS)
 Luggage net
 Power antenna
 Rear park assist
 Security system
 Side-impact airbags (SIAB)
 Traction control system (TCS)
 Trip computer
 16-inch alloy wheels [Series 1]
 17-inch alloy wheels [Series 2]

Adventra 
The Holden Adventra is Holden's first all-wheel drive variant built on the wagon platform. It was produced between October 2003 and February 2005 also acting as the basis of commercial derivates in the form of the Crewman Cross 8 and Holden Special Vehicles sports variants. The Adventra is based on the VY II Commodore station wagon but features an all-wheel drive configuration as opposed to a rear-wheel drive running gear. Available in two equipment levels—CX8 and LX8—with a standardised driveline consisting of a single powertrain combination.

Over the standard Commodore wagon, the Adventra adds a 60/40 split rear seat and additional gauges above the central ventilation outlets. Black plastic accents on the front and rear bumpers along with the wheel guards visually distinguished the Adventra from the Commodore.

Extra-cost options available included third-row seating, cargo hold down nets, and an off-road recovery kit.

Holden replaced the VY II with the VZ Adventra in 2004. An interim VZ Adventra appeared in August 2004 at the time of the release of the VZ Commodore range, but this was in essence the familiar VY body with VZ engine, running gear, ECU and a VZ compliance plate. A true VZ series facelift was introduced in February 2005 and with it, the introduction of a V6 engine as the principal power unit.

Commercial range

The VU Ute range was facelifted in 2002 to create the VY-based Ute range. These commercial vehicles received the same upgrades as the sedan/wagon range, which involved a new, sharper-designed nose, and restyled interior. The same three specification models were carried over for the VY and picked up the same upgraded equipment lists as the VY sedans. The VY ute models were not badged as "Commodores".

The VY range marked major change for Holden's Ute range, with the 2003 addition of two new models: the return of the One Tonner cab-chassis utility after an 18-year hiatus; and the introduction of Holden's first-ever 4-door utility, arriving in the form of the Crewman. Powered by a  V8 engine, the Cross 8 featured a modified appearance, more suited to an off-road vehicle.

Both the Crewman and One Tonner models added instant sales to the Holden range, sparking rapid expansion of the Holden Ute range, its first major growth spurt since its 1990 reintroduction. Once again the same three specifications were carried over for the VY, with the Ute range available in base Ute, S & SS forms. The same did not apply for the One-Tonner cab-chassis range though – it was available in just two model forms, base and S.
Base: Based on Commodore Executive specification.     Available with 3.8-litre  Ecotec V6
S : Based on Commodore S specification. Available with 3.8-litre  Ecotec V6 – 4sp auto, 5sp manual
SS: Based on Commodore SS specification. 5.7-litre  Generation 3 V8 – 6sp manual or 4sp auto

By December 2003 the Crewman range had expanded to include Holden's very first AWD utility in the form of the Crewman Cross 8. The Cross 8 received bolstered wheelarches, raised ride height as well as additional equipment, with the sole drivetrain being the recently upgraded Gen.3 V8 connected to a 4-speed automatic. V6-powered versions of the One Tonner & Crewman were only available with automatic transmission. The VY's were superseded by the arrival of the VZ range in August 2004.

HSV range (Y Series) 

The enhanced performance VY range sold by Holden Special Vehicles (HSV) is marketed as the Y Series and it comprised the variants listed below, alphabetically. For the first time, HSV stopped adopting the same series code as the mainstream donor cars in order to further differentiate its products.

Avalanche 

The HSV Avalanche is an all-wheel drive crossover SUV that was manufactured by Holden Special Vehicles (HSV) between 2003 and 2005. Based on the Holden Adventra LX8 crossover wagon, the Avalanche range also incorporated a dual-cab utility model known as the HSV Avalanche XUV. The XUV derived from the Holden Crewman Cross8.

Both HSV vehicles were built in two series, the 2003 "Y Series II" (the wagon was actually available as of October/November 2003) and an updated version of the "Y Series II", which included some of the upgrades found in the newer "Z Series" HSV models. These later models are quite rare, with a building life of nine months from April 2005 to December 2005.

As with the related Holden VY all-wheel drive vehicles, the HSV Y Series AWD vehicles as built from September 2004 to March 2005 confusingly have Z Series compliance and Vehicle Identification Numbers; this correlates to the building of new specification Holden VZ and Z Series HSV non-AWD cars during this period.

The updated Avalanches with some of the Z Series upgrades can be externally visually differentiated from the Y Series versions by their re-profiled front bumper unit that looks less aggressive and which features a more integrated appearance to the auxiliary driving lights.

Permanent all-wheel drive was calibrated to deliver 62 percent of the power to the rear wheels, thereby maintaining a rear-wheel drive feel to the handling of these vehicles.

Along with Holden's V8 Commodore-based AWD vehicles, the HSV Avalanche series was discontinued in late 2005 due to phasing out of the 5.7-litre LS1 engines because of the Euro III emissions regulations.

Clubsport 

VY Clubsport was based on the VY Holden Commodore frame. The V8 5.7litre GEN3 Chevrolet engine was revised to produce 260KW this model was available in 4 Speed auto or 6 Speed Manual.

GTS 
VY GTS was a special order only vehicle with very limited build numbers, making it one of the most sought HSV's of the future. Only 100 of these cars were produced

Maloo 

HSV's facelifted Y Series (as opposed to VY series in Holden terminology) was released in October 2002. Enhancements such as Climate Control air conditioning and the 'Performance' Brake System were made standard equipment on Maloo, with the 'Premium' Brake system now standard equipment on Maloo R8. New paint colours included Hothouse Green and Turbine Grey. 167 standard Maloo versions and 132 R8 models were produced in the original Y Series.

New paint colours for the Maloo range were Syracuse (gold) and HSV Ultra Violet. 312 standard Maloo versions and 361 R8 models were produced in Y Series 2.

Senator Signature 
Following a slight change to the HSV series naming method, the Y Series Senators, based on the VY Commodore debuted in 2003. The Y-series naming method caused confusion with most people still calling it the VY. Featuring even more angular and aggressive styling, the Y series offered both an entry-level grand tourer Senator and high luxury Senator Signature models. Both came standard with a revised Luxury suspension tune, rear parking sensors and  LS1 engine. In addition to the features found on the Senator, the Senator Signature came with larger  alloy wheels (the Senator came equipped with  wheels), different seats and larger front brakes.

Some of the features that were introduced on the Y-series Senator include oil and battery gauges on the centre stack, shale leather trim interior trim as well as white backing for the instruments. A leather steering wheel was added to improve grip and feel when turning and more memory options for the front electric seats to cater to different users. HSV redesigned the front seats because of complaints from the customers they were too uncomfortable.

Standard features include a CD stacker, power mirrors and windows, cruise control, climate control, engine immobilizer and remote central locking. A rear DVD player and headphones were added. Front and side airbags were standard across the whole range. Two extra safety features were added: an electric tyre pressure monitoring system and  High-Intensity Discharge (HID) driving lights. Once again the fully independent multi-link rear suspension is standard on the Senator. GPS or Satellite navigation and the sunroof are not standard with this model but are available at extra cost.

New badging featured on the Senator read "260" reflecting the increased power output. The brake and some of the engine cooling vents located on the front bumper are slightly hidden to keep its luxury well present while viewing the vehicle. Mesh cloth is located at the front air dams. Some of the side skirts front and rear air dams and the lower parts of the exterior mirrors are coloured in a satin finish grey. The rest is finished in the body colour. The famous "Senator" nameplates are featured on the side skirts, rear and at the bottom of the rear doors.

Some of the interior changes include alloy pedals, new colours, a re-designed four-spoke steering wheel with remote audio controls, white finish instrument dials and minor gauges now in their own dedicated binnacle in the centre of the dash. The multi-function read-out has been re-programmed to show the HSV logo and the vehicle build number and identification during start-up. Automatic climate control and a Blaupunkt 6-disc CD stacker are standard and 8 speakers. Carbon fibre trim is found throughout the cabin as well as light shale leather trim. The starting price for the Senator at the time was $74000.

Motorsport 

The VY Commodore was used in the Supercars Championship between 2003-2005

Exports 

Exports of the VY were made to the Middle East as the Chevrolet Lumina from 2002 as per the previous VX series. Trim levels were the Lumina LS sedan and wagon (based on Commodore Executive), Lumina S (Commodore S), Lumina LTZ (Berlina), and Lumina SS (Commodore SS).

General Motors do Brasil imported the VY as the Chevrolet Omega from 2003 to replace the VX-based Omega. This update was announced 28 April 2003. The Brazilian model sold as a single-specification CD model, based on the Holden Calais. VY Omega sales ended in 2005 when replaced by the VZ-based model, as announced on 9 March 2005.

In September 2003, Chevrolet Lumina exports started in Malaysia in LTZ trim (based on the Holden Berlina), followed by Thailand in October with LTZ (Berlina) and S trims. Singapore was added as an export market by 2004 with the Lumina LTZ. Exports to Singapore ended during 2004; Malaysia and Thailand sales continued in VZ form from 2004.

References 

Cars of Australia
VY
Full-size vehicles
Rear-wheel-drive vehicles
Coupé utilities
Sedans
Station wagons
Police vehicles
Cars introduced in 2002
Cars discontinued in 2004